Wushan County is a county in the east of Gansu Province of China. It is under the administration of the prefecture-level city of Tianshui. Its postal code is 741300, and in 1999 its population was 418,648 people. The population in 2017 was 500,000 people.

History
Humans have inhabited the area since at least 38,000 years ago. The county was knows as Xinxing during the Eastern Han Dynasty (188 AD). During the Song dynasty it was named Ningyuan. Since the Republic of China it holds the current name.

Administrative divisions
Wushan County is divided to 13 towns and 2 townships.
Towns

Townships
 Zuitou Township()
 Yan'an Township

Climate

Economy
Agricultural produce from Wushan are wheat, artichoke, flax, rapeseed, tomato, carrot, Amaranth grain, Codonopsis and Angelica. Iron, copper and molybdenum mines are also present in the county.

Culture
Cuisine
Wushan food is a mix of Lanzhou, Sichuan and Tibetan cuisine. Specialities from the region are:
 Donut shaped Youtiao
 Pork and beef hotpot
 Barbecue trout
 Liangpi
 Dandan noodles
 Jiaotuan: sticky corn-flour jelly
 Jiangshui: a kind of sour vegetable soup
 Tianpei: Sweet highland barley dessert
 Fried artichoke balls: Deep-fried flour-artichoke balls
 Sanfan: glutinous flour soup with beans
 Guanguan tea – a kind of tea brewed with rock sugar, jujube, Chinese wolfberry and longan in a clay pot on a fire.

References

See also
 List of administrative divisions of Gansu

County-level divisions of Gansu
Tianshui